The 2015 Styrian state election was held on 31 May 2015 to elect the members of the Landtag of Styria.

The election saw major losses for the Social Democratic Party of Austria (SPÖ) and Austrian People's Party (ÖVP), the two major parties, matched by huge gains for the Freedom Party of Austria (FPÖ). The SPÖ finished first on 29.3% and 15 seats, just ahead of the ÖVP's 28.5% and 14 seats. The FPÖ placed a close third with 26.8%, and tied the ÖVP in seats.

Governor Franz Voves resigned after the election. The SPÖ and ÖVP renewed their coalition government, but during negotiations, it was unexpectedly announced that ÖVP leader Hermann Schützenhöfer would become Governor, despite his party being the smaller of the two. The SPÖ claimed it was a necessary concession to prevent an ÖVP–FPÖ coalition; nonetheless, the announcement caused significant controversy. Schützenhöfer was sworn in on 15 June.

Background
After the 2010 election, the SPÖ won a narrow victory over the ÖVP, and the two parties formed a coalition government.

Prior to amendments made in 2011, the Styrian constitution mandated that cabinet positions in the state government be allocated between parties proportionally in accordance with the share of votes won by each; this is known as Proporz. As such, the government was a perpetual coalition of all parties that qualified for at least one cabinet position. In November 2011, the Landtag voted to amend the constitution to remove this requirement. As such, the 2015 election was the first in post-war Styrian history in which conventional coalition formation could take place.

Electoral system
The 48 seats of the Landtag of Styria are elected via open list proportional representation in a two-step process. 38 of the seats are distributed between four multi-member constituencies. For parties to receive any representation in the Landtag, they must win at least one seat in a constituency directly. Seats are distributed in constituencies according to the Hare quota, with ten leveling seats allocated using the D'Hondt method at the state level, to ensure overall proportionality between a party's vote share and its share of seats.

Contesting parties

In addition to the parties already represented in the Landtag, three parties collected enough signatures to be placed on the ballot:

 NEOS – The New Austria (NEOS)
 Team Stronach (TEAM)
 Pirate Party of Austria (PIRAT)

Opinion polling

Results

Results by constituency

Aftermath
Prior to the election, Governor Franz Voves stated he would resign if the SPÖ fell below 30% of vote share. As the party fell short of this target, albeit by less than one percentage points, Voves announced his resignation. He was replaced as party leader by Michael Schickhöfer. Formal coalition talks between the SPÖ and ÖVP proceeded. As the SPÖ was the larger party, it was naturally expected that they would retain the governorship. However, after several days of negotiations, the government announced that Voves would be succeeded by ÖVP leader Hermann Schützenhöfer. This was received poorly by opposition parties and the federal SPÖ alike, who criticised it as a breach of political convention. The Styrian SPÖ claimed it had been done to prevent the ÖVP from defecting and forming a coalition with the FPÖ. The government took office on 16 June.

References

2015 elections in Austria
State elections in Austria
May 2015 events in Europe